The  Karroun Hill Nature Reserve is a 3097 km2 nature reserve in the Mid West region of Western Australia, about 310 km north-east of Perth.

Description
The reserve lies at an altitude of 300–480 m above sea level in pastoral farming country. It possesses extensive areas of intact woodland and shrubland lost from much of the adjacent Western Australian wheatbelt through clearing for agriculture. The mulga-eucalypt line crosses the reserve, delineating the boundary between arid wattle-dominated, and temperate eucalypt-dominated, botanical regions. The vegetation consists mainly of York and salmon gum woodlands and dense Acacia thickets.

Birds
The land protected by the reserve has been identified by BirdLife International as an Important Bird Area (IBA) because it supports populations of the vulnerable malleefowl, regent parrots, rufous treecreepers, and western yellow robins.

References

Coolgardie woodlands
Mid West (Western Australia)
Nature reserves in Western Australia
Important Bird Areas of Western Australia